The North American green toad (Anaxyrus debilis), formerly in the genus Bufo, is a species of toad found in the southwestern United States in the states of Arizona, New Mexico, Colorado, Kansas, Oklahoma and Texas, as well as in northern Mexico in the states of Tamaulipas, San Luis Potosí, Durango, and Zacatecas. It is commonly called green toad (with many variants).

Description
Green toads are typically bright to pale green in color, with black spotting.

Habitat and reproduction
Green toads are relatively widespread and at least locally common. They are secretive, however, only readily found during and immediately after periods of rainfall; their habitat is semi-arid and often very dry. Breeding occurs from late March to August, stimulated by summer rains. Males move from drier, terrestrial habitat to aquatic breeding sites where they form choruses. Females are attracted by chorusing males. Breeding aggregations do not usually last long, only a few days.

Subspecies 
Two subspecies, originally described as separate species, can be identified, but this distinction is disputed:
Eastern green toad, Anaxyrus debilis debilis
Western green toad, Anaxyrus debilis insidior

See also 
European green toad (Bufo viridis), a species that is only distantly related, but shares the same common name.

References 

debilis
Amphibians of Mexico
Amphibians of the United States
Fauna of the Southwestern United States
Fauna of the Rio Grande valleys
Amphibians described in 1854